Greens Restaurant is a landmark vegetarian restaurant in the Fort Mason Center in the Marina District, San Francisco, California, overlooking the Golden Gate Bridge.

Founded by the San Francisco Zen Center in 1979, Greens has been credited in The New York Times as "the restaurant that brought vegetarian food out from sprout-infested health food stores and established it as a cuisine in America."

Annie Somerville was the chef before Denise St. Onge. The current head chef is Katie Reicher. The restaurant utilizes fresh produce from the organic Green Gulch Farm Zen Center.

Books
 The Greens Cookbook.  Deborah Madison with Edward Espe Brown.  Random House Broadway imprint. , .
 Fields of Greens.  Annie Somerville. Bantam Books.

See also
 California Cuisine
Chez Panisse
Moosewood Restaurant
 Green Gulch Farm
 Tassajara Zen Mountain Center

References

External links
 

San Francisco Zen Center
Restaurants in San Francisco
Vegetarian restaurants in California
Restaurants established in 1979
 
1979 establishments in California